Black Hill is one of the steepest hills of the Sidlaw range in South East Perthshire. Black Hill is located near Collace and is smaller than King's Seat and Higher than Dunsinane Hill,

References

Mountains and hills of Perth and Kinross